Rotadiscus is a genus of small air-breathing land snails, terrestrial pulmonate gastropod mollusks in the family Charopidae.

Species
Species within the genus Radioconus include:
 Rotadiscus hermanni (L. Pfeiffer, 1866) - type species of the genus Rotadiscus
 Rotadiscus insularis (Climo, 1978)
 Rotadiscus jamiesoni (Climo, 1978)
 Rotadiscus protoinsularis Climo, 1989
 Rotadiscus smithae (Dell, 1954)
 Rotadiscus takakaensis (Climo, 1981)
 an undescribed species of Rotadiscus from Toca do Gonçalo cave in Brazil

References

External links

Charopidae